The Battalion of Special Operations is a unit of the Military Police of Paraná, Brazil. It is a police tactical unit in the State of Parana, trained to perform high-risk operations that fall outside of the abilities of regular officers.

History
Originally the special operations of the Military Police of Paraná State was to counter-guerrilla warfare, but with the end of the Cold War it was transformed into special operations of law enforcement.

Duties
BOPE team members' duties include: performing hostage rescues and counter-terrorism operations; serving high risk arrest and search warrants; subduing barricaded suspects; and engaging heavily armed criminals. BOPE teams are often equipped with specialized firearms including submachine guns, assault rifles, breaching shotguns, riot control agents, stun grenades, and sniper rifles. They have specialized equipment including heavy body armor, ballistic shields, entry tools and advanced night vision optics.

Organization

 1st Company (special patrol)
1st Platoon of special patrol
2nd Platoon of special patrol
 2nd Company (special patrol)
1st Platoon of special patrol
2nd Platoon of special patrol
 3rd Company (riot control)
1st Platoon of riot control
2nd Platoon of riot control
 4th Company (riot control)
1st Platoon of riot control
2nd Platoon of riot control
 5th Company (special operation)
 Team of tactical squad
 Team of snipers squad
 Team of bombs disposal squad
 6th Company (Police dog)
1st Platoon of K-9
2nd Platoon of K-9

Weapons

Similar named police units of the Brazilian police force
BOE or BOPE are acronyms that can refer to the following specialized military police units:

BOE (Batalhão de Operações Especiais) units:
Special Operations Battalion (PMAC) - in Acre
Special Operations Battalion (PMDF) - in the Federal District
Specials Battalion Operations (PMMT) - in the state of Mato Grosso
Special Operations Battalion (PMPR) - the state of Paraná
Special Operations Battalion (PMPI) - the state of Piauí
Special Police Operations Battalion (PMRS) - in Rio Grande do Sul state

BOPE (Batalhão de Operações Policiais Especiais) units:
Special Police Operations Battalion (PMAL) - the state of Alagoas
Special Police Operations Battalion (PMRR) - in the state of Roraima
Special Police Operations Battalion (PMSC) - the state of Santa Catarina
Special Police Operations Battalion (PMERJ) - in the state of Rio de Janeiro
Special Police Operations Battalion (PMRN) - in Rio Grande do Norte state

See also
 Military Police (Brazil)
 Military Police of Paraná State

References 

Specialist police agencies of Brazil
Paraná
Organisations based in Paraná (state)